Thomas Yellowtail (March 7, 1903 - November 24, 1993) was a Medicine Man and Sun Dance chief of the Crow tribe for over thirty years prior to his death. Thomas Yellowtail's adult life was dedicated to the adherence to, and preservation of, the Sun Dance religion.

Early reservation life
Thomas Yellowtail was born just south of Lodge Grass, Montana, on the Crow Indian reservation. His father's name was Hawk with the Yellow Tail Feathers. It was the practice at the time for the U.S. Government to assign surnames to the Indians as a means of assimilating them into the white culture and to ease record keeping. Thus, the child of Hawk with the Yellow Tail Feathers and his wife was given the last name Yellowtail. In Yellowtail’s younger days, the old, great warriors who participated in the Plains Wars and had lived the traditional nomadic life of their people were still living, although they had been forced onto the reservations. Yellowtail often recalled seeing the old warriors as they sat around the camp fires and performed sacred ceremonies.

Spiritual influences
The Lodge Grass valley was called the "Valley of the Chiefs" because of all the great war chiefs who lived there in Yellowtail’s early years. When he was only six years old, Yellowtail received a great honor when one of the Crow Nation’s most famous chiefs, Medicine Crow, gave Yellowtail his Indian name, Medicine Rock Chief. Receiving a name from such a famous chief was all the more significant as the name came from Chief Medicine Crow's personal spiritual medicine. Yellowtail’s youth was shaped by these elders who had lived the traditional nomadic life. These “old timers” as Yellowtail called them, taught him to know and to love the traditional spirituality of his ancestors. Yellowtail’s character was shaped by those traditional elders and he often said that it is those same traditional spiritual values which should be at the center of our lives today.  
 
In contrast, the United States Government tried to crush the Indian’s ancestral traditions. Various laws (United States Secretary of the Interior's order of 1884) prohibited many traditional ceremonies, such as the Sun Dance for almost 50 years. During this same time, the reservation children, including Yellowtail, were taken from their homes and forced into government boarding schools. At those boarding schools the children were forbidden to speak their own language, had to wear white man's clothing and cut their hair.

Simultaneously, almost every Christian denomination opened churches on or near the reservations and actively tried to convert the Indians away from their own traditions. On the Crow reservation each family was arbitrarily assigned to become a member of one of the churches.

Return of the Sun Dance to the Crow Tribe
The Crow tribe did not perform their ancestral Sun Dance during the fifty year prohibition by the U.S. Government. When the Sun Dance became legal again in 1934, the original Crow Sun Dance was a forgotten memory and could not be resurrected. The Shoshone tribe had periodically performed their ancestral Sun Dance during the prohibition without the knowledge of the bureaucracy in Washington. When the prohibition ended, John Trehero, a Shoshone medicine man, emerged as the preeminent Shoshone Sun Dance chief. The Crow tribe asked John Trehero to help them lead a Sun Dance on the Crow Reservation in the early 1940s. This was the beginning of the revival of the Sun Dance on the Crow Reservation.

Starting in 1943, Thomas Yellowtail became a sincere Sun Dancer, participating in the annual Sun Dance and monthly prayer meetings. Over the next twenty years, Yellowtail deepened his relationship with the Great Spirit through his daily practice of prayer, purification in the sweat lodge and periodic vision quests.

Medicine Man and Sun Dance Chief
In 1963, John Trehero informed Yellowtail that his Medicine Fathers had instructed him to transfer the authority to run the Crow Sun Dance over to Yellowtail. For the next thirty years, until his death at age 90, Yellowtail served as Crow Sun Dance chief and helped perpetuate the Crow Sun Dance Religion. At the time of his death in November, 1993, Thomas Yellowtail was one of the most respected and revered Sun Dance chiefs and Medicine Men of the Crow tribe.

Preserving the old ways
Yellowtail wanted every American Indian to learn about the spiritual traditions of their ancestors. While many of those traditions have been lost, Yellowtail believed that what remains is sufficient to constitute a valid spiritual path - what he called the Sun Dance Religion. Yellowtail counseled the Native Americans who sought his guidance to follow the way of the Vision Quest, sweat lodge, and Daily Prayer with the Pipe under the guidance of a legitimate Sun Dance Chief. He encouraged American Indian youth to learn the language of their tribe and to seek out the spiritual leaders who followed the traditional ceremonies of their people. Thomas Yellowtail wrote his autobiography as a means of preserving the ancient spiritual traditions he held sacred for future generations.

Thomas Yellowtail was a member of that pivotal generation that made the wrenching cultural transition into a new and bewildering world, while never forgetting the old ways. He, and many others across the plains tribes, held fast to the spiritual legacy of their ancestors, insuring that the ways of his Grandfathers would not be lost.

Bibliography
 Yellowtail Crow Medicine Man and Sun Dance Chief, an autobiography as told to Michael Oren Fitzgerald, University of Oklahoma Press, 1991. 
 Native Spirit and the Sun Dance Way, by Thomas Yellowtail, World Wisdom 2007.

Film
Native Spirit and the Sun Dance Way, DVD documentary based on the memoirs of Thomas Yellowtail, 2007, World Wisdom.

Resource materials
 Companion Book to Native Spirit and the Sun Dance DVD

References

External links
Obituary in the New York Times
Author Page with slideshows
Rodney Frey's page on Yellowtail
Native Spirit's page on Yellowtail

1903 births
1993 deaths
People from Big Horn County, Montana
Religious figures of the indigenous peoples of North America
Crow tribe
American animists
Traditionalist School
20th-century Native Americans